Mark Edward Broadhurst (born c. 1955) is a New Zealand former rugby league footballer. He played professionally in Australia and the United Kingdom, and played for New Zealand from 1979 to 1983.

Playing career
He was a Schoolboy Kiwi in 1970 and played in the Canterbury Rugby League competition for Papanui. Broadhurst represented Canterbury, the South Island and New Zealand before moving overseas to play for the Manly-Warringah Sea Eagles, Illawarra Steelers and Hull Kingston Rovers.

One of the most memorable incidents in his career was his brawl with Newtown Jets player Steve Bowden during the minor semi-final match of the 1981 NSWRFL season.

County Cup Final appearances
Mark Broadhurst played left-, i.e. number 8, in Hull Kingston Rovers' 12–29 defeat by Hull F.C. in the 1984 Yorkshire County Cup Final during the 1984–85 season at Boothferry Park, Kingston upon Hull, on Saturday 27 October 1984.

John Player Special Trophy Final appearances
Mark Broadhurst played left-, i.e. number 8, in Hull Kingston Rovers' 12–0 victory over Hull F.C. in the 1984–85 John Player Special Trophy Final during the 1984–85 season at Boothferry Park, Kingston upon Hull on Saturday 26 January 1985.

Later years
Broadhurst later coached Papanui in the Canterbury Rugby League competition. In 2020, Broadhurst revealed that he had been diagnosed with Alzheimer's disease.

Honours and legacy

In 2013, Broadhurst was inducted as a New Zealand Legend of League. 

Since 2018, the Manly Warringah Sea Eagles and the New Zealand Warriors have played for the Broadhurst-Shelford trophy, named for Mark Broadhurst and the late Kiwis prop Adrian Shelford.

References

External links
Mark Broadhurst Era of the Biff profile

1950s births
Living people
Canterbury rugby league team players
Hull Kingston Rovers players
Illawarra Steelers players
Manly Warringah Sea Eagles players
Marist-Western Suburbs players
New Zealand national rugby league team players
New Zealand rugby league coaches
New Zealand rugby league players
Papanui Tigers players
Rugby league players from Christchurch
Rugby league props
South Island rugby league team players
Year of birth missing (living people)